Viscount Montgomery may refer to:

 Viscount Montgomery, of the Great Ardes (Peerage of Ireland, created in 1622)
 Hugh Montgomery, 1st Viscount Montgomery (c. 1560–1636)
 Hugh Montgomery, 2nd Viscount Montgomery (1597–1642) 
 Hugh Montgomery, 3rd Viscount Montgomery (c. 1625–1663) 
Viscount Montgomery subsidiary title of the Marquess of Powis (Peerage of England, created in 1687)
 Viscount Montgomery of Alamein (Peerage of the United Kingdom. created in 1946)
 Bernard Montgomery, 1st Viscount Montgomery of Alamein  (1887–1976) 
 David Montgomery, 2nd Viscount Montgomery of Alamein (1928–2020)

Montgomery